Kalinga ornata is a species of large, colourful nudibranch in the family Polyceridae. It is the only species in the genus Kalinga, which is the type genus of the subfamily Kalinginae.

Distribution
Kalinga ornata resides in the deep coastal waters of the Indo-West Pacific (though it has also been reported from Hawaii).

 
While it occasionally washes up in shallow regions, live individuals have been observed by divers at a depth of 6 m, 
they have been trawled from depths of 76 m, and observed by an ROV at a depth of 182 m.

Description
Kalinga ornata is nocturnal, reaching sizes of at least 130 mm, and prefers sandy or silty substrate. It has been shown to feed on brittle stars, a completely unique diet for a nudibranch.

References 

Polyceridae
Gastropods described in 1864